Chiniot Dam is a proposed dam to be built on Chenab river. It is located in Chiniot District, Punjab, Pakistan.

References

Dams in Pakistan
Dams on the Chenab River
Hydroelectric power stations in Pakistan
Chiniot District
Dams in Punjab, Pakistan